An Uneventful Story is a 1983 Polish film directed by Wojciech Jerzy Has, starring Gustaw Holoubek. The film is an adaptation of a short story by Anton Chekhov and tells the story of a professor of medicine who begins an affair with a young pupil.

Plot
Michal (Gustaw Holoubek) is a middle aged professor of medicine in a provincial town who is bored by the mundane and superficial nature of his life, friends and family. Katarzyna (Hanna Mikuc), a young woman returns to the town and the two have an affair.

Cast
  Marek Bargielowski as Michal
  Wladyslaw Dewoyno as Mikolaj
  Ewa Frackiewicz 
  Janusz Gajos as Aleksander Gnekker
  Jacek Glowacki 		
  Gustaw Holoubek as Professor
  Jan Konieczny	
  Janusz Michalowski as Piotr
  Hanna Mikuc as Katarzyna
  Anna Milewska as Weronika
  Wlodzimierz Musial 		
  Jerzy Zygmunt Nowak as Waiter
  Elwira Romanczuk as Liza
  Leszek Zentara as Student

Production
Has first submitted a script for An Uneventful Story to the communist authorities as the follow up project to The Saragossa Manuscript, when it was rejected he made The Codes (Szyfry) instead. The film was the director's first after a hiatus of 10 years, after Has had a number of projects blocked by the communist authorities because he had taken The Hour-Glass Sanatorium to the Cannes Film Festival against their wishes. It was filmed in the city of Tarnów in the Polish province of Małopolskie.

Release
The film was released on 12 September 1983.

See also
 The Diary of an Old Man, Canadian film based on the same source material
 Cinema of Poland
 List of Polish language films

References

External links
 

1983 films
1980s Polish-language films
Films directed by Wojciech Has
Films based on short fiction
Films based on works by Anton Chekhov